John Anthony Leavey (3 March 1915 – 9 July 1999) was a British company director and Conservative politician.

Family business
Leavey's father George was chairman of Smith & Nephew, then an engineering firm who had not yet specialised in medical devices. He went to Mill Hill School and then Trinity Hall, University of Cambridge before returning to east Lancashire where he became a director of companies involved in the weaving and matchmaking industries in Colne and Rawtenstall.

War service
As the Second World War loomed, Leavey joined up and served in the 5th Royal Inniskilling Dragoon Guards in France and Belgium; he only just escaped at Dunkirk, being one of the last to be evacuated. On arriving back in Britain the regiment underwent training in the midlands where Leavey organised a pack of fox hounds with which to go fox hunting. He was pleased to return to liberate France after D Day, fighting through to the end of the war. He was mentioned in despatches and reached the rank of Major. After demobilisation in 1946, Leavey was employed by the family firm of Smith and Nephew and became a Director in 1948. He joined the Yorkshire Hussars in the Territorial Army as a Major in 1952, but left in 1955.

Politics
At the 1950 general election he was picked to challenge the already well-known Labour MP Barbara Castle in Blackburn East. At his second shot at the seat in 1951, he cut her majority to the point at which the seat looked vulnerable. Instead of fighting again, he was selected for Heywood and Royton, a Conservative seat where the sitting MP was retiring.

Parliamentary career
Leavey won at the 1955 general election. He was a strong supporter of the government over the Suez Crisis and attacked nearby Labour MPs for supporting Gamal Abdel Nasser, being rewarded with appointment as Parliamentary Private Secretary to Walter Monckton for one year from 1956 and later to Derick Heathcoat Amory in 1959; however, his loyalty did not stretch to accepting what he saw as government indifference to the local cotton industry. When his pressure resulted in the passing of the Cotton Industry Act 1959, it was felt to have aided his campaign locally; despite it, in 1962, he was one of five Conservative MPs to support a Labour motion of censure on the subject.

Some of Leavey's campaigns attracted attention, with his call for an end to the teaching of Latin in schools among them. He was insistent that he knew there had been flying saucers over Lancashire, and wanted girls who went topless to be arrested. He supported Anthony Wedgwood Benn in his campaign to allow peers to renounce their titles. In 1961 he was made Secretary to the 1922 Committee of Conservative backbenchers.

When Prime Minister Harold Macmillan sacked seven members of his cabinet in the "Night of the Long Knives" in 1962, Leavey praised him for being ruthless with colleagues when necessary. He had a tough fight at the 1964 general election, as Labour had his seat as a target. Leavey, who had a major operation shortly before the election, was ultimately unable by 818 votes to retain it.

Business appointments
After leaving Parliament he paid more attention to his work at Smith and Nephew (which had continued in the background during his career, and seen him appointed Deputy Chairman in 1962) and also became Chairman of Wilson (Connolly) Holdings, a midlands-based firm of builders. He had other business interests and was a member of the South East London Industrial Tribunal from 1978 to 1984. In 1982 he wrote (together with Richard Bennett) an official history of Smith and Nephew from its foundation in 1856.

Recreations
Enthusiastic about country activities, Leavey continued to enjoy fox hunting and also took part in point-to-point races. He was a council member of the Outward Bound Trust from 1974 to 1992 and also became a trustee of the Kurt Hahn Trust in 1987. He also enjoyed fishing.

References
Who Was Who, A&C Black
Obituary by John Barnes, The Independent, 15 September 1999.

1915 births
1999 deaths
5th Royal Inniskilling Dragoon Guards officers
Alumni of Trinity Hall, Cambridge
Conservative Party (UK) MPs for English constituencies
People educated at Mill Hill School
UK MPs 1955–1959
UK MPs 1959–1964
British Army personnel of World War II
Yorkshire Hussars officers